Mesochorus is a genus of ichneumon wasps in the family Ichneumonidae. There are at least 690 described species in Mesochorus.

See also
 List of Mesochorus species

References

Further reading

External links

 

Parasitic wasps